Loitering with Intent is a novel by Muriel Spark.

Loitering with Intent may also refer to:
Loitering with Intent (film), 2014 American comedy film
Loitering with Intent: The Child (1992) and Loitering with Intent: The Apprentice (1997), the two volumes of Peter O'Toole's autobiography
The criminal offence of loitering, as defined in English law by the Penal Servitude Act 1891